Raymond Darlington Felix (December 10, 1930 – July 28, 1991) was an American professional basketball player. He was born in New York City. He played high school basketball at Metropolitan High School in New York and college basketball at Long Island University. Felix was the No. 1 overall pick of the 1953 NBA draft.

Basketball career
A 6' 11" center from Metropolitan High School and Long Island University, Felix was selected by the Baltimore Bullets with the first pick in the 1953 NBA Draft.

Felix won the NBA Rookie of the Year Award in 1954 after averaging 17.6 points and 13.3 rebounds. Felix was also the second African-American, following Don Barksdale, to be named an All-Star. His 13.3 rebounds is on the List of National Basketball Association rookie single-season rebounding leaders.

After his rookie season, Felix was traded on September 17, 1954. The soon to be folded Baltimore Bullets traded Felix and Chuck Grigsby to the New York Knicks for Alfred McGuire and Connie Simmons.

In six seasons with the Knicks, Felix averaged 12.0 points and 9.1 rebounds.

On January 24, 1960 Felix was traded by the Knicks, with a 1960 4th round draft pick (Ben Warley was later selected), to the Minneapolis Lakers for Dick Garmaker and a 1960 2nd round draft pick (Dave Budd was later selected).

In his Lakers tenure, the team moved from Minneapolis to Los Angeles and his role turned to a reserve one. He averaged 6.4 points and 6.7 rebounds in three seasons.

The Lakers lost to the Celtics in the 1962 NBA Finals, in seven games. Felix averaged 4.0 points and 4.0 rebounds in the series, which marked the end of his NBA career.

Overall, Felix spent nine seasons in the league, and played for the Bullets, New York Knicks and the Minneapolis/Los Angeles Lakers. Felix averaged 10.9 points and 8.9 rebounds per game, with career totals of 6,974 points and 5,652 rebounds. He retired in 1962.

Russell rivalry
Felix had an incident with future hall of famer Bill Russell in Russell's rookie season, when after Russell felt Felix had been trying to intimidate him, he knocked Felix unconscious with a punch to the head.

Toward the end of his career, after having several of his shots blocked by Russell, Felix took the ball then flung it off the side of the backboard, saying to Russell, smiling, "You didn't get that one!"

Felix and the Lakers lost to Russell and the Celtics in the 1962 NBA Finals, in seven games.

After Basketball
Following his retirement, Felix worked for the New York City Department of Parks and Recreation where he sponsored a basketball tournament in Elmhurst, Queens and later worked as a supervisor at Harlem men's shelter.

Felix died of a heart attack on July 28, 1991. He had a son, Ray Jr., with his wife Gloria.

NBA career statistics

Regular season

Playoffs

References

External links
Ray Felix Career Stats

1930 births
1991 deaths
African-American basketball players
American men's basketball players
Baltimore Bullets (1944–1954) draft picks
Baltimore Bullets (1944–1954) players
Basketball players from New York City
Centers (basketball)
LIU Brooklyn Blackbirds men's basketball players
Los Angeles Lakers players
Minneapolis Lakers players
National Basketball Association All-Stars
New York Knicks players
20th-century African-American sportspeople